The Moses Mabhida Stadium is a football stadium in Durban in the KwaZulu-Natal province of South Africa, named after Moses Mabhida, a former General Secretary of the South African Communist Party. It is a multi-use stadium. The stadium became a venue for several events, like bungee jumping, concerts, cricket, soccer, golf practice, motorsports and rugby union.

It was one of the host stadiums for the 2010 FIFA World Cup. The stadium has a capacity of 55,500 (expandable up to 75,000). The stadium is adjacent to the Kings Park Stadium, in the Kings Park Sporting Precinct, and the Durban street circuit used for the A1GP World Cup of Motorsport. 
It includes a sports institute, and a transmodal transport station.

History
This newly built stadium is located on the grounds of the Kings Park Soccer Stadium, in the Durban sports precinct in the suburb of Stamford Hill. The stadium had the capacity to hold 62,760 spectators during the 2010 FIFA World Cup. Its design allows the stadium seating to be adjusted; 55,500 for local matches or up to 75,000 for events such as the Commonwealth Games. It has two permanent tiers of seating, a temporary third one was added for the World Cup.

There are 120 corporate hospitality suites with 7,500 seats.

Dimensions 
Stadium: 320m×280m×45m

Arch

The arch also represents the once divided nation coming together, inspired by the South African Flag. The arch consists of a 5×5m steel hollow box and weighs 2,600 tonnes. A funicular carries visitors from the north side of the stadium to a viewing platform at the top of the arch, offering a view over city and ocean. The south side features a 550-step adventure walk.
On 24 February 2010 the world's largest swing opened at the stadium. The swing allows clients to jump off the 4th ladder rung and fall toward the pitch before being swung out in a  arc over the pitch.

Roof
These are attached to the arch by 95mm diameter steel cables. The roof covers 88% of the seats.

Bowl
Around the perimeter, 1,750 columns and 216 raking beams provides the main support. Around the field, 900m of retaining walls stretches 8m high. A total of 1,780 pre-cast concrete seating panels creates the bowl form.

Façade
Over 100 columns surround the stadium. The height of the columns varies around the stadium, but the highest is 46m. In total  of façade surround the stadium. A total of 550 aluminium fins fit between the main columns. Perforated metal sheeting was placed between the aluminium fins, where required.

Construction progress

Completion 
Construction of the stadium was officially completed on 24 November 2009 and the first official match played there was between Amazulu and Maritzburg United on 29 November, with Maritzburg United winning 1–0.

Major events
In December 2015, the award-winning gospel ensemble Joyous Celebration recorded their first outdoor recording for Joyous Celebration 20 at the Moses Mabhida Stadium.

2019 #Gcwalisaimabhida Maksandi music festival

30 March 2019, Khuzani Indlamlenze Mpungose hosted #Gcwalisaimabhida Maskandi music festival, he is the first Maskandi artist to host a successful event in a sports venue like Moses Mabhida stadium, the venue was sold out. The music festival was sponsored by Isolezwe, Ukhozi FM, Ethekwini municipality.. To name a few.

2022 Commonwealth Games 

The stadium had been scheduled to host the opening ceremony and athletics events of the 2022 Commonwealth Games, which was awarded to Durban in 2015, however the Commonwealth Games Federation withdrew hosting rights in 2017 due to funding concerns.

Tournament results

2010 FIFA World Cup
The stadium was one of the venues for the 2010 FIFA World Cup and hosted five group games, one round game and a semi-final match. During the World Cup, the stadium was referred to  "Durban Stadium".

2013 African Cup of Nations
Moses Mabhida Stadium served as one of the venues for the 2013 African Cup of Nations. It hosted 4 group games, 1 quarter final and a semi final. The games were:

Soccer
The stadium is the current home ground of Premier Soccer League team, AmaZulu. It has seven matches during the 2010 FIFA World Cup, and hosted various finals such as the 2010 MTN 8, the 2012 Telkom Knockout, the 2013 MTN 8, the 2013 Nedbank Cup and the 2014 Nedbank Cup.

Cricket

Cricket

A single T20I match has been hosted at Moses Mabhida Stadium.

The stadium hosted a Twenty20 cricket match between South Africa and India on 9 January 2011. The match was played for the Krish Mackerdhuj Trophy, which India won by 21 runs. The stadium witnessed the biggest ever crowd for a cricket match on the African continent which was followed by a concert to celebrate South Africa-India ties.

Concerts and events

References

External links

City World Cup Site
Stadium website
 https://web.archive.org/web/20190114113128/http://www.bigrush.co.za/
Photos of Stadiums in South Africa at cafe.daum.net/stade
360 degree Virtual Tour of Moses Mabhida Stadium (6 locations)
360 View
Kirigami model of Durban stadium

Soccer venues in South Africa
Cricket grounds in South Africa
Sports venues in Durban
2010 FIFA World Cup stadiums
Multi-purpose stadiums in South Africa
Sports venues completed in 2009
Music venues in South Africa
2009 establishments in South Africa
Gerkan, Marg and Partners buildings
21st-century architecture in South Africa